Miss Grand Cambodia 2022 was the eighth edition of the Miss Grand Cambodia beauty contest, held on 27 August 2022 at the Union of Youth Federations of Cambodia in Phnom Penh, Cambodia. Miss Grand Cambodia 2021 Pokimtheng Sothida crowned her successor, Saravody Pich Votey at the end of the event.

Delegates from twenty-five provinces and three cities of Cambodia, as well as Cambodian communities in seven countries, competed for the title, of which, the representative of Preah Sihanouk province, Saravady Pich Votey, was announced the winner, and will represent the country at Miss Grand International 2022.

Background

Location and date
The eighth edition of the Miss Grand Cambodia beauty contest was scheduled to be held on 27 August 2022. The press conference of the contest will be conducted in Phnom Penh.

Selection of participants

Applications for Miss Grand Cambodia started on 7 May and applications ended on 15 July. The official press presentation for Miss Grand Cambodia 2022 will be held on 25 July 2022. Miss Grand Cambodia this year for the first time, is officially allowing international countries to participate with debuting countries Canada, New Zealand, Thailand and Vietnam to participate whereas Australia, France and United States to return from the 2020 edition of Miss Grand Cambodia.

The crown

A new crown will be used to award the winner of the Miss Grand Cambodia pageant for the 2022 edition. The crown costs US$250,000 (KHR 1,019,513,000 ៛). Extra crowns will be awarded to the runners-up, but this time the runners up will be sent to other international pageants. The winner will be sent to Miss Grand International 2022, the 1st runner-up will be sent to Miss Earth 2022, the 2nd runner-up will be sent to Miss Global for 2023, the 3rd runner-up will be sent to Miss Interglobal for 2023 and the 4th runner-up will be sent to Miss Polo International for 2023.

Results

Main placements

§: The candidate won the Miss Popular Choice Award (online voting) and got direct entry into Top 15.

Special awards

Candidates

35 contestants competed for the title.

References

External links 
Miss Grand Cambodia – Facebook
Miss Grand Cambodia – Instagram

Beauty pageants in Cambodia
Miss Grand Cambodia
Grand Cambodia 2022
2022 in Cambodia